El Buen Pedro is a 2012 Peruvian thriller drama film written and directed by Sandro Ventura. Starring Miguel Torres-Böhl. It premiered on September 20, 2012, in Peruvian theaters.

Synopsis 
Pedro is a calm, hermetic and absolutely orderly guy. He gets up early to go to work serving the public. In addition, he likes to cook, listen to music and go out to kill at 2 in the morning. Gabriel Barba is the policeman in charge of searching for this unstoppable murderer. However, he has problems that distract him: he is in love with Ángela, a prostitute with whom he lives and whom he cannot touch, because she, in revenge for not fulfilling everything she promised him, does not allow it. A dark and intense story, where satisfaction becomes the reason for violent events, which occur in a universe plagued by characters trapped in their own labyrinth.

Cast 
The actors participating in this film are:

 Miguel Torres-Bohl as Pedro
 Roger del Águila as Gabriel Barba
 Natalia Salas as Ángela
 Adolfo Aguilar as Iván
 Carlos Álvarez as Commander
 Adriana Quevedo as Milagros
 Laura Del Busto as Luisa
 Sofía Bogani as Cinthya
 Catherine Díaz as Verónica
 Lizeth Campano as Carla
 Mayra Goñi as Susan
 Valeria Bringas as Mary
 Miguel Vargas as Hernán
 Jazmín Pinedo as Kelly
 Maya Alvarado as Lola

Reception 
El Buen Pedro drew 28,116 viewers in its entire theatrical run.

References

External links 

 

2012 films
2012 thriller drama films
2012 crime drama films
Peruvian thriller drama films
Peruvian crime drama films
Serial killer films
Big Bang Films films
2010s Spanish-language films
2010s Peruvian films
Films set in Peru
Films shot in Peru
Films about assassinations
Films about prostitution